Moondla may refer to:

 Moondla, Huzur, a village in Madhya Pradesh, India
 Moondla, Jamwa Ramgarh, is a village in Rajasthan, India

See also
 Moondla Chattan, a village in Madhya Pradesh, India
 Mundla Chand, a village in Madhya Pradesh, India
 Mundlamuru
 Mundlapadu
 Moondla Bisoti, a village in the Atru tehsil in Baran district, Rajasthan, India